Brian McCray Allred (born March 16, 1969) is a former American football defensive back who played for the Seattle Seahawks of the National Football League (NFL). He played college football at Sacramento State University.

References 

Living people
1969 births
American football defensive backs
Sacramento State Hornets football players
Seattle Seahawks players